National Highway 326 (NH 326) is a National Highway in the Indian states of Andhra Pradesh and Odisha. It was formed as a new highway by up-gradation of former state highways of the states. It starts at Asika of Odisha and ends at Chinturu road of Andhra Pradesh.

Route 

It starts at Asika and passes through Rayagada, Koraput, Jeypore, Malkangiri, Motu in Odisha and ends at Chintoor Road in Andhra Pradesh.

State-wise route length are:

Odisha - 

Andhra Pradesh -

See also 
 List of National Highways in Andhra Pradesh

References 

326
326
National highways in India